Precious Hearts Romances Presents: Lumayo Ka Man Sa Akin (International title: Even If You Go Away From Me) is a 2012 Philippine romantic drama television series based on Precious Hearts Romances novel series Pangako created by Martha Cecilia and directed by Katski Flores and Toto Natividad. It also serves as the 15th installment of the Precious Hearts Romances Presents series. The series stars Maja Salvador, Jason Abalos and Patrick Garcia, together with an ensemble cast. The series premiered on ABS-CBN's Kapamilya Gold afternoon block and worldwide on The Filipino Channel from January 23, 2012, to May 4, 2012, replacing Reputasyon and was replaced by Aryana.

The series was streaming online on YouTube.

Story
Janine del Castillo is one of Cebu's most promising interior designers. She is engaged to Matthew de Vega, a handsome lawyer from a rich family.  She seems to have a perfect life, until she finds out that her father has a terminal disease.  He finally admits to Janine that she is the product of an illicit affair, and his dying wish is for her to meet her mother.

In Manila, some twenty years ago, Maurice fell in love with a woman named Consuelo, who worked in the home depot he owned.  While applying for that job, Consuelo concealed the truth - that she is married and already had a daughter in Quezon - to have a better chance of being hired.  Eventually, Consuelo fell for Maurice and this produced a love child, Janine.  Consuelo became overcome by guilt so she left Maurice and Janine to return to her family.

After Maurice's death, Janine goes to a rural barrio in Quezon to find her mother.  Here she encounters copra farm owner Jake Falcon - a brash, self-confident man oozing with sex appeal.  Janine's guarded nature immediately clashes with Jake's macho, devil-may-care attitude.  An attraction and unspoken sexual tension develops between them.

Janine meets Consuelo in the transient house that she runs with her husband Anselmo and their daughter Karla.  Janine pretends to be as a student on a research trip and rents a room from them to be able to stay close to her mother.

Janine finds it difficult to find the right timing to tell Consuelo about her true identity.  She ends up staying in Quezon for a longer time than she originally intended.  Circumstances keep causing her to bump into Jake, and soon, she realizes that she is developing strong feelings towards him.  She feels comfortable to be herself with Jake, something that she never felt with Matthew.   Things get complicated with the arrival of Matthew.  He wants Janine to leave Quezon with him.  But Janine is undecided:  she still wants a closure with Consuelo, and she is now secretly in love with Jake.  Jake tells Janine that he isn't going to give up on her so easily.  This leads to a passionate sexual encounter.

Janine finally decides that she wants to be with Jake, but her happiness is cut short when she finds out that her half-sister Karla is pregnant - and Jake is the father.  Janine knows she can never live with herself if she deprives the unborn child of its father, so she urges Jake to do the right thing.  Janine decides to leave Quezon, but before she does, she has a talk with Consuelo who had figured out that she is her long-lost daughter.  They agree to keep in touch even though they're far away.

Back in Cebu, Janine tells Matthew all that has transpired.  She wants to be fair to him, so she breaks the engagement.  Eventually, Matthew wins her back.  In the meantime, Jake does everything to be a good husband and father to Karla and their baby.  A tragedy forces Janine and Matthew to return to Quezon.

Eventually, Jake and Janine's feelings are rekindled, and Matthew notices this.  Matthew becomes possessive in his jealousy.  Janine wants to remain faithful to him, but being with Matthew not only stifles her but starts crushing her spirit.

Janine realizes that soon, she will have to make a choice.  Should she continue honoring her commitment to the man she is supposed to marry, or will she let herself find happiness in a man who loves her selflessly and lets her feel free?

Cast and characters

Main cast
 Maja Salvador as Janine del Castillo
 Jason Abalos as Jake Falcon
 Patrick Garcia as Matthew de Vega

Supporting cast
 Ina Feleo as Karla Cordero-Falcon
 Ina Raymundo as Consuelo Cordero
 Toby Alejar as Anselmo Cordero
 Kathleen Hermosa as Angela
 Miko Palanca as Greg
 Jamilla Obispo as Pinpin Dimaano
 John Arcilla as Juanito Falcon
 Bettina Carlos as Ali
 Guji Lorenzana as Neil
 Marlann Flores as Leila
 Joshua Colet as Stefano

Extended cast
 Raye Baquirin as Edna
 Robin Tolentino as Don
 Jordan Hong as Antonio
 Jef Gaitan as Marla

Special participation
 Kyline Alcantara as Young Janine
 Julio Pisk as Young Matthew
 Angelina Canapi as Sandra de Vega
 Ariel Rivera as Maurice del Castillo

Production
Lumayo Ka Man Sa Akin is not available in all ABS-CBN Regional Network Group (now ABS-CBN Regional) channels due to local versions of TV Patrol on the same timeslot. Instead a replay of recent broadcasts are shown the next day mostly Tuesdays-Saturdays on its Morning block.

This is also Patrick Garcia's first project with his comeback to the network after 6 years.

See also
 List of programs broadcast by ABS-CBN
 List of ABS-CBN drama series
 Precious Hearts Romances Presents

References

External links
 
 
 
 https://www.youtube.com/watch?v=PV84kmpKaDY

ABS-CBN drama series
Philippine romance television series
Television shows based on books
2012 Philippine television series debuts
2012 Philippine television series endings
Filipino-language television shows
Television shows filmed in the Philippines